Harcharan may refer to 

Harcharan Chawla, Urdu Writer
Hercharn Singh, First Sikh in Pakistan Army
Harcharan Singh Brar, Former Punjab chief Minister
Harcharan Singh Longowal, Sikh and Akali Leader
Harcharan Singh Balli, Indian Politician
Harcharan Singh (field hockey), an Indian field hockey player
Harcharanjit Singh Rapal a British-Indian bhangra musician